Shoki Mmola (born August 10, 1977)  is a South African actress. She is  famous for her acting role of Celia Kunutu the mother and stepmother of Rachel Kunutu and Nimrod Kunutu respectively in the soap, ''Skeem Saam.

Personal life
Shoki was born in Tzaneen. She attended Prudens Secondary school and further her studies at Tampere University of Technology

She was married to fellow actor and producer Sello Sebotsane. The couple has a daughter, Oratile Kutlwano. In 2018, Shoki was strangled twice, punched several times in the face and in the body by Sello. These two separate incidents of domestic violence occurred at their Kibler Park home, south of Johannesburg. She sustained injuries to her face, stomach and legs after the assault. Later Sebotsane was charged with domestic violence and assault with intent to do grievous bodily harm. The court case was opened in 2016 at Mondeor police station in Johannesburg.

Awards  and Nominations
 She was nomited by Golden Horn Award for Best Actress in a Lead Role in a TV Drama.

Filmography

References

Living people
1977 births
People from Tzaneen
South African casting directors
Women casting directors
South African soap opera actresses
Tampere University of Technology alumni